"Independence Day" is a song written by Gretchen Peters, and recorded by American country music singer Martina McBride. The song was officially released in May 1994 as the third single from her album The Way That I Am.  The song peaked at number 12 on Hot Country Songs. Peters later recorded it herself on her 1996 album The Secret of Life. It was first offered to Reba McEntire, who turned it down.

In 2003, it ranked 50th in CMT's 100 Greatest Songs of Country Music. The following year, it ranked #2 in CMT's 100 Greatest Videos in Country Music. The song was also featured in CMT's Controversy in terms of release and included interviews from "The Today Show" reporter Tiki Barber, Brad Paisley, McBride herself, and former National Organization for Women president Patricia Ireland.  In 2014, Rolling Stone magazine ranked the song #77 in their list of the 100 greatest country songs.  The song has sold 550,000 copies in the US as of July 2015.

"Independence Day" won the Country Music Association Award for Song of the Year in 1995, making Peters only the second woman to win the award and the fourteenth songwriter to win the award with a solo composition.

Content
In the song, a daughter (Heidi Butler Prine) recalls a tragic incident she experienced as a child. Her mother (Darcie Jones) was involved in a domestic abuse incident with her alcoholic father (Aaron Wrench). On Independence Day, the daughter walks to the town fair and hears rumors going on about the father's abuse. Apparently the whole town knew about the abuse, but did nothing to help stop it. That day, the mother burns down their house, presumably with the husband and herself inside it, and the daughter is sent to a county home. The music video was produced by American director team Deaton-Flanigen Productions, consisting of William Deaton III and George Flanigen IV, and premiered on CMT May 20, 1994.

The lyrics have a double meaning in that the woman in the story is finally gaining her "freedom" from her abusive husband. Thus, it is her "Independence Day." The title also refers to the fact that the events noted in the song happened on the United States' Independence Day, or July 4.

In media
Beginning shortly after September 11, 2001 attack on the World Trade Center, Sean Hannity began using part of the chorus as an opening bumper for his Premiere Radio Networks radio talk show. Writer Gretchen Peters objected to Hannity's use, arguing the song was about domestic violence, not patriotic values. Since she could not stop his use, she collected royalties from him every time it was played and used those royalties to donate to her causes, until Hannity's program dropped the song in mid-2014.

Personnel
Credits from album liner notes.
Joe Chemay – bass guitar
Ashley Cleveland – backing vocals
Paul Franklin – pedal steel guitar
Vicki Hampton – backing vocals
Bill Hullett – acoustic guitar
Mary Ann Kennedy – backing vocals
Brent Mason – electric guitar
Martina McBride – lead and backing vocals
Steve Nathan – keyboards
Pam Rose – backing vocals
Lonnie Wilson – drums
Paul Worley – acoustic guitar

Chart performance

Certifications

Awards and nominations

It received the RIAA Gold Certificate on December 12, 2018.

Cover versions
In 2002, singer Taylor Horn covered the song for her debut album taylor-made at the age of nine.

In 2003,  Pat Benatar performed the song in a duet with McBride on the CMT television series Crossroads.

On American Idol, Carrie Underwood, Lil Rounds, and Tristan McIntosh have each performed the song on the show. Underwood also released the song as a B-side track with her single of "Inside Your Heaven".

In 2011, Little Big Town performed Independence Day as a tribute to McBride, who was being honoured as part of ACM's Girls Night Out - Superstar Women of Country show.

In 2019, McBride performed the song as the opener to the 53rd CMA Awards alongside a host of other women in country music. Those featured were: McBride, Dolly Parton, Carrie Underwood, Reba McEntire, Jennifer Nettles, Karen Fairchild, Kimberley Schlapman, The Highwomen, Tanya Tucker, Gretchen Wilson, Crystal Gayle, Terri Clark and Sara Evans.

In October 2019, Kelly Clarkson performed Independence Day during the Kellyoke segment of her daytime talk show The Kelly Clarkson Show.

In 2021, the band American Aquarium recorded the song on their album Slappers, Bangers and Certified Twangers Vol. 2.

References

1994 singles
1994 songs
Martina McBride songs
Taylor Horn songs
Carrie Underwood songs
Songs with feminist themes
Songs written by Gretchen Peters
Music videos directed by Deaton-Flanigen Productions
Song recordings produced by Paul Worley
RCA Records singles
Songs about domestic violence
Holiday songs
Black-and-white music videos